Sarsai Nawar Wetland, also known as Sarsai Nawar Jheel is a bird sanctuary in Sarsai Nawar, Etawah district, Uttar Pradesh, India.  It aims to conserve waterbirds, notably the Sarus Crane. It has been designated as a protected Ramsar site since 2019.

Gallery

See also
 Saman Bird Sanctuary
 Etawah Safari Park
 Dhanauri Wetlands
 Basai Wetland

References

External links

Ramsar sites in India
Lakes of Uttar Pradesh
Bird sanctuaries of Uttar Pradesh
Wildlife sanctuaries in Uttar Pradesh
Sarsai_Nawar
Wetlands of India
Tourist attractions in Etawah district
2019 establishments in Uttar Pradesh
Protected areas established in 2019